Anne-Sophie Bion is a French film editor best known for her work in the 2011 silent film, The Artist, directed by Michel Hazanavicius.

On 24 January 2012 Bion received an Academy Award nomination for Best Film Editing for her work in The Artist. She was jointly nominated with Hazanavicius in the category.

Filmography

References

External links

Living people
French film editors
Year of birth missing (living people)
French women film editors